Woolumbool is a locality in the Australian state of South Australia located about  south-east of the state capital of Adelaide and about  west of the municipal seat in Naracoorte.

Woolumbool’s boundaries were created on 3 December 1998 for the “local established name” which is derived from the cadastral unit of the  Hundred of Woolumbool.  The locality's boundaries align with those of the Hundred with exception to its southern boundary where the following roads form the boundary - Old Coach Road and Fairview Road.

The 2016 Australian census which was conducted in August 2016 reports that Woolumbool had a population of 68 people.

Woolumbool is located within the federal division of Barker, the state electoral district of MacKillop and the local government area of the  Naracoorte Lucindale Council.

References

Limestone Coast